The 1966 USAC Championship Car season consisted of 16 races, beginning in Avondale, Arizona on March 20 and concluding at the same location on November 20.  There was also one non-championship event at Fuji Speedway in Japan. The USAC National Champion was Mario Andretti, and the Indianapolis 500 winner was Graham Hill. At Indianapolis, Chuck Rodee was killed while qualifying for the 1966 Indianapolis 500. Also of note was the end of the career of two time 500 and two time National Champion Rodger Ward as he ran the final three races of his IndyCar career at the start of the season which included the final IndyCar victory of his career at Trenton.

Schedule and results

 No pole is awarded for the Pikes Peak Hill Climb, in this schedule on the pole is the driver who started first. No lap led was awarded for the Pikes Peak Hill Climb, however, a lap was awarded to the drivers that completed the climb.

Final points standings

Note: Jerry Grant, Dan Gurney, Jim Clark, Jackie Stewart, Graham Hill, Peter Revson and Cale Yarborough are not eligible for points.

See also
 1966 Indianapolis 500

References
 
 
 http://media.indycar.com/pdf/2011/IICS_2011_Historical_Record_Book_INT6.pdf  (p. 256-259)

USAC Championship Car season
USAC Championship Car
1966 in American motorsport